The  is the 17th edition of the Japan Film Professional Awards. It awarded the best of 2007 in film. The ceremony did not take place in this year.

Awards 
Best Film: I Just Didn't Do It
Best Director: Nobuhiro Yamashita (The Matsugane Potshot Affair, A Gentle Breeze in the Village)
Best Actress: Eri Ishida (Sad Vacation)
Best Actor: Ryo Kase (I Just Didn't Do It)
Best New Director: Daihachi Yoshida (Funuke Show Some Love, You Losers!)
Best New Director: Keisuke Yoshida (Tsukue no Nakami)
Best New Encouragement: Hitoshi Matsumoto (Big Man Japan)
Special: Hiroshi Kobayashi

10 best films
 I Just Didn't Do It (Masayuki Suo)
 Retribution (Kiyoshi Kurosawa)
 Sad Vacation (Shinji Aoyama)
 Big Man Japan (Hitoshi Matsumoto)
 Tama Moe! (Junji Sakamoto)
 Hannin ni Tsugu (Tomoyuki Takimoto)

References

External links
  

Japan Film Professional Awards
2008 in Japanese cinema
Japan Film Professional Awards